The Camden Ouachitas were a minor league baseball team based in Camden, Arkansas in 1906. Preceded by the 1894 Camden Yellow Hammers, the Camden teams played as members of the Class D level Arkansas State League in 1894 and Arkansas-Texas League in 1906. Camden hosted home minor league games at Recreation Park.

History
After fielding a team in 1893, minor league baseball first came to Camden, Arkansas when the 1894 Camden Yellow Hammers became members of the Class D level Arkansas State League. The league began play on May 30, 1894. The Camden franchise, along with the Hot Springs, Arkansas based Hot Springs Bathers franchise, both folded one month into the 1894 season, causing the four–team league to fold. Camden, also referred to as the "Rainmakers" in some references, finished with a 7–10 record to place 3rd in the league standings. Camden finished 4.5 games behind the 1st place Little Rock Rose Buds, who ended with an 11–5 record.

In 1906, the Camden Ouachitas became charter members of the Class D level Arkansas-Texas League. Camden was joined by the Hot Springs Vapors, Pine Bluff Barristers and Texarkana Shine-Oners as the charter members of the four–team league.

The Camden "Ouachitas" moniker corresponds to Camden being within Ouachita County and the Ouachita Mountains that lie within the Camden region.

Beginning league play on June 21, 1906, Camden ended the Arkansas-Texas League regular season with a record of 29–28. Camden finished in 2nd place in the final standings, playing under managers Arthur Riggs and Cleve Turner. The Camden Ouachitas finished behind the 1st place Pine Bluff Barristers (32–26) and ahead of the 3rd place Texarkana Shine-Oners/Hope Tigers (29–30) and Hot Springs Vapors (25–32) in the final standings.

Camden, Arkansas has not hosted another minor league team.

The ballpark
The 1894 Camden Yellow Hammers played minor league home games at Recreation Park.

Timeline

Year–by–year records

Notable alumni
Ralph McLaurin (1906)

See also
 Camden Ouachitas players

References

External links
Camden - Baseball Reference

Defunct baseball teams in Arkansas
Baseball teams established in 1906
Baseball teams disestablished in 1906
Camden, Arkansas
Defunct Arkansas-Texas League teams